The Little Sioux River is a river in the United States. The Little Sioux River was known as Eaneah-waudepon or "Stone River" to the Sioux Indians. Its tributaries include the Ocheyedan River, Maple River and the West Fork of the Little Sioux River. The Little Sioux River is integral to the Nepper Watershed Project, a major Iowa flood control and soil conservation program that was introduced in 1947.

At Turin, Iowa, the Little Sioux River has a mean annual discharge of 1,761 cubic feet per second.

History
 
Prior to the sale of French Louisiana to the United States, the river was known as the Rivière des Aiaouez meaning "River of the Ioways".
 
The Little Sioux Valley was important in the Spirit Lake Massacre of 1857, when the Santee Sioux chief Inkpaduta made forays as far downstream as Smithland. The river valley also figures prominently in folklore about the nineteenth century outlaw, Jesse James, who reportedly used the secluded valley, with its wooded ravines, as a hideout and a route north to Minnesota during the 1870s.

Geology
Geologically, the Little Sioux rises in a region of glacial potholes near the "Iowa Great Lakes" (Spirit Lake, and East and West Okoboji). It then traverses a rich agricultural region on its way to the Loess Hills, from which it then flows out onto the floodplain of the Missouri River. Through much of its middle course (i.e., from Linn Grove to Smithland) the Little Sioux is a relatively wild meandered stream, with excellent canoeing, camping, and fishing opportunities. However, from Smithland downstream to its mouth, the river has been channelized and environmentally degraded.

Flooding
Flooding of the river is common in early to late spring, as the often-heavy winter snow melts.  This has resulted in riparian woodlands of cottonwood trees adjacent to fertile farm ground on the bottomlands.  Correspondingly, hunters are rewarded with a bounty of white-tailed deer, rabbits and pheasants during the fall hunting season.

Fishing
Fishing opportunities are best in late spring after flood waters have dissipated.  Edible gamefish such as bullhead and channel catfish are frequently caught with nothing more than a hook and worm, with northern pike, walleye, and shovelnose sturgeon also available.

See also
List of rivers of Iowa
List of rivers of Minnesota

References

External links
The Little Sioux at Anthon, Iowa

Rivers of Iowa
Rivers of Minnesota
Tributaries of the Missouri River
Rivers of Cherokee County, Iowa
Rivers of Harrison County, Iowa
Rivers of Clay County, Iowa